Hogtown or Hog Town may refer to certain places in Canada or the United States:

 Hogtown, Florida, a former community in Alachua County, Florida
 Hogtown, Indiana

Nicknames:
 a historic nickname for Toronto, Ontario (see Name of Toronto)
 a historic nickname for Cincinnati, Ohio
 Hog Town, early name for King City, California

Other uses
Hogtown (film), 2016